Captain Royce Coleman Dyer,   (February 1, 1889 – December 30, 1918) was a Canadian soldier who fought during World War I and had led a Russian unit during the North Russia intervention which was part of the Allied intervention in the Russian Civil War after the October Revolution. He died of broncho-pneumonia on December 30, 1918, while serving in Russia.

Early life and World War I
The son of the five-term mayor of Sutton, Quebec, Leon C. Dyer, Royce Coleman Dyer was born in Sutton on February 1, 1889. Before the war he worked as a butcher.

Dyer enlisted on September 23, 1914, in Valcartier, Québec and was assigned to the 8th Bn, Canadian Infantry (Manitoba Regiment), the 'Black Devils'. He participated in a number of WWI battles during his service, including the Second Battle of Ypres.  During the Battle of Mont Sorrel his actions earned him the Military Medal. During this action he was gassed. After losing consciousness he was found in a ditch two days later, then spent the next month in hospital. After being promoted to Sergeant, he was hospitalized after breaking a rib during the Battle of the Somme, and again knocked out of action after suffering a gunshot wound to the torso.

North Russia intervention

While recovering in England from his bullet wound, he was approached about joining the Special Service Force that was being sent to assist anti-Bolshevik forces near Archangel, Russia as part of the Allied North Russia intervention. He attracted the attention of the unit's commander General Edmund Ironside after his actions while taking the village of Onega, for which he received the Distinguished Conduct Medal.

Dyer's Battalion
General Ironside needed more men for his Russian occupation force and so looked to recruit local Russians.  When enrollment figures came up short he took the suggestion of one of his staff and looked to recruit criminals from the local prisons. Called the Slavo-British Allied Legion (SBAL) he assigned their training to Dyer, who was promoted to Lieutenant. With British, Australian and Canadian officers Dyer created a unit of just under three hundred ex-prisoners. The men viewed their Lieutenant with much respect and took to calling themselves “Dyer’s Battalion.” Encouraged by the progress of the unit Allied Russian command promoted Dyer to Captain. During training, disaster struck when he died from broncho-pneumonia. The unit never recovered but to show their respect the men carried around a huge portrait of Dyer when marching, as is the Eastern Orthodox tradition of an Icon. With their namesake dead, morale in the Battalion plummeted. Dyer had resisted enlisting suspected Bolsheviks but after his death, high command ignored this and many imprisoned Russian Bolsheviks were added to the unit. When the unit was moved to the front lines tensions grew and on July 7, 1919, the men murdered their officers. The mutineers then ordered the soldiers to cross enemy lines and join the Bolsheviks.

Death
Dyer became ill while serving in Russia and on December 27, 1918, he was admitted to the 82nd Casualty Clearing Station in Bakharitza suffering from fever. The medics there diagnosed his ailment as broncho-pneumonia, then a deadly disease, which he died from three days later, on December 30, 1918. Enlisting in 1914 and dying long after World War I had ended, he was one of the first Canadians to volunteer and the last to die. He is buried at Archangel Allied Cemetery.

Bibliography 
Notes

References 

 
 
 – Total pages: 400 
 

 – Total pages: 301
 – Total pages: 322
  

 

1889 births
1918 deaths 
Canadian Expeditionary Force soldiers
Canadian military personnel of the Russian Civil War
Canadian recipients of the Distinguished Conduct Medal
People from Sutton, Quebec
Deaths from Spanish flu
Burials at Archangel Allied Cemetery
Canadian recipients of the Military Medal
Deaths from bronchopneumonia
Deaths from pneumonia in Russia
Canadian military personnel of World War I
Canadian military personnel from Quebec
Canadian Army soldiers
Canadian Expeditionary Force officers